Canadian rapper and record producer Kardinal Offishall has released five studio albums, one extended play (EP), thirty-three singles, and five mixtapes.

In 1997, Offishall released his debut album, Eye & I, on independent label Capitol Hill Music, to critical acclaim. In 2000, he released the EP, Husslin', also independently on Figure IV Entertainment, which helped establish him as one of Canada's best hip-hop producers. The same year, Kardinal signed with major label MCA Records, and released his second album Quest for Fire: Firestarter, Vol. 1 in 2001. The lead single, "BaKardi Slang", became his first single to appear on a US Billboard chart. After releasing the single "Belly Dancer" in 2003, he left MCA Records after it was absorbed by Geffen Records.

In 2005, Offishall released his third album, Fire and Glory, on the Canadian division of Virgin Records. The single "Everyday (Rudebwoy)" became a top twenty hit in Canada. In 2008, his fourth album Not 4 Sale was released on Kon Live Distribution, a subsidiary of Geffen Records. The album was a critical success, spawning the hit single "Dangerous". The single was his first to chart on the Billboard Hot 100, peaking at number five, and was certified triple platinum in Canada. In 2012, Offishall released Allow Me to Re-Introduce Myself, a collaborative mixtape with producer Nottz. He released his fifth album, Kardi Gras, Vol. 1: The Clash, on his independent label Black Stone Colleagues Inc. and Universal Music Canada in 2015.

Albums

Studio albums

Extended plays

Mixtapes

Singles

As lead artist

As featured performer

Guest appearances

Music videos

See also
Kardinal Offishall production discography

References

External links
Kardinal Offishall at Discogs

Discographies of Canadian artists
Hip hop discographies